KPM may stand for:

 King's Police Medal for Gallantry, British award
 Königliche Porzellan-Manufaktur (Royal Porcelain Factory, Berlin), German porcelain manufacturer
 Koninklijke Paketvaart-Maatschappij (1888-1966), former Dutch East Indies shipping company
 KPM Musichouse, a British stock music company
 Kilopondmetre, kpm, a unit of torque

See also
 KMP (disambiguation)